Bayan (Russian: Баянъ) was the third of the four  armoured cruisers built for the Imperial Russian Navy in the early 1900s. The ship was assigned to the Baltic Fleet. She was modified to lay mines shortly after World War I began. Bayan laid mines herself and provided cover for other ships laying minefields. The ship fought several inconclusive battles with German ships during the war, including the Battle of Åland Islands in mid-1915. She also participated in the Battle of Moon Sound during the German invasion of the Estonian islands in late 1917, where she was damaged. Bayan was decommissioned in 1918 and sold for scrap in 1922.

Design and description
The ship had a crew of 568 officers and men. Bayan  was named in honor of the earlier Russian cruiser of the same class captured by the Japanese during the Russo-Japanese War. Both ships were named for the legendary bard, Boyan.

Steam for the engines was provided by 26 Belleville boilers.

Bayans main armament consisted of two  45-calibre guns in single turrets fore and aft. Her eight  guns were mounted in casemates on the sides of the ship's hull. Anti-torpedo boat defense was provided by twenty-two  50-calibre guns; eight of these were mounted in casemates on the side of the hull and in the superstructure. Two guns were astern, in the admiral's apartments, and the remaining twelve guns were located on upper deck amidships (eight above the six-inch gun casemates), in pivot mounts with gun shields. The ship also had two submerged  torpedo tubes, one mounted on each broadside.

In early 1916, eight of the ship's 75 mm guns in the central casemate were removed, and in early 1917, the rest were removed as well. By early 1917, an additional eight-inch gun was fitted on the centreline forward of the mainmast  (it was supposed to be protected with a gun shield, but the photos do not confirm this). In addition, four more six-inch guns were added on an upper deck, two on each broadside. In early 1917, Bayan was also fitted with two anti-aircraft 76 mm Lender guns, mounted to the sides of the after turret.

The ship used Krupp armour throughout.

Service
Bayan was built by the Admiralty Shipyard in Saint Petersburg. Construction began on 15 August 1905, although she was ceremonially laid down only on the day of her launching 15 August 1907. Bayan was completed in early 1911 and commissioned on 14 July 1911. She spent her entire career with the Baltic Fleet.

When World War I began, Bayan was assigned to the First Cruiser Brigade. Shortly after the start of the war, in December 1914 Bayan was modified to carry up to 110 mines. She laid her first mines in early December when she was one of a group of ships that mined the northern and western entrances to the Gulf of Danzig. The following month, she provided cover as other cruisers laid minefields in the western Baltic Sea, near Bornholm and Rügen Islands on the night of 12 January 1915. Together with her sister  and two protected cruisers, she fought a brief and inconclusive action with the light cruiser  during the night of 6/7 May while covering a minelaying sortie off Libau.

On 2 July, the ship participated in the Battle of Åland Islands when intercepted and decoded wireless signals informed the Russians that a small German force was at sea to lay a minefield off Åland. Rurik and Novik got separated from the others in fog, but the rest of the force encountered the light cruiser  and a number of destroyers escorting the minelayer . The Russians concentrated on Albatross, which was forced to run aground in Swedish territorial waters, while the faster Augsburg escaped to the south. The Russian cruisers were low on ammunition when they encountered two more German cruisers and broke off the action after Bayan and the armoured cruiser  exchanged hits. Bayan fired 40 eight-inch rounds and was hit with one 210 mm round amidships, which caused superficial damage and wounds to two crewmen. Roon lost her wireless aerial due to a near miss; the Russians reported more hits, but not confirmed.

Battle of Moon Sound

In 1917, Bayan was the flagship of Vice Admiral Bakhirev, who now commanded the naval forces defending the Gulf of Riga. During Operation Albion, the invasion of the Estonian islands of Saaremaa (Ösel), Hiiumaa (Dagö) and Muhu (Moon), in October 1917, the ship defended the southern entrance to Moon Sound on 17 October. When the German minesweepers began clearing the minefields guarding the entrance, they were attacked by Bayan and the predreadnought , while the predreadnought  engaged the dreadnoughts  and  defending the minesweepers. Slava was hit multiple times by the German ships and Bakirev ordered his forces to withdraw. Bayan was the last ship to withdraw, but she was hit once by a  shell from König before she moved out of range. The shell penetrated the deck near the forward turret and started a fire among the flammable material in the cable compartment that was not extinguished until the next day. Fragments from the shell destroyed a bulkhead and loosened some plates of the ship's bottom. The location of the fire near the forward magazine forced it to be flooded as a precaution. The shell killed five men and wounded three more. Despite her increased draught, Bayan was able to pass through the dredged channel connecting the northern and southern parts of Moon Sound later that day. When the general withdrawal was ordered the following day, the ship sailed for Finland.

She was paid off in 1918 and did not participate in the Russian Civil War. Bayan was sold for scrap in 1922 and broken up in Stettin.

Notes

Footnotes

References

External links

 World War I Naval Operations in the Baltic theater

Bayan-class cruisers
Ships built at Admiralty Shipyard
1907 ships
World War I cruisers of Russia